Pine Forge Academy is a co-educational, Seventh-day Adventist Christian boarding school that serves grades 9 through 12. It is a part of the Seventh-day Adventist education system, the world's second largest Christian school system. It is located in Berks County, Pennsylvania.  The land for the school grounds was purchased for $46,000 by the founders of the school from the family of Thomas Rutter, who was an abolitionist during the 18th century.  The building used for the headmaster's residence (the Manor House) was once used as a staging point for the underground railroad. The property was listed on the National Register of Historic Places as the Pine Forge Mansion and Industrial Site in 2004.

Academics
The required curriculum includes classes in the following subject areas: Religion, English, Oral Communications, Social Studies, Mathematics, Science, Physical Education, Health, Computer Applications, Fine Arts, and Electives.

Principal history
Throughout the History of Pine Forge many great principals have passed through the institution. This is a table documenting the names, and tenures of the principals of Pine Forge Academy.

Buildings

There are five buildings on the campus of Pine Forge Academy: Handy Hall, Kimbrough Hall, Jessie R. Wagner Hall, and North Hall and the gymnasium.
Handy Hall is named after Ronald L. Handy, a member of the Pine Forge Academy staff for 18 years. 
Kimbrough Hall is named after Dr. Grace Kimbrough, one of the founders of the Pine Forge Institute. 
Wagner Hall is named after John H. Wagner, the former president of the Allegheny East Conference of the Seventh-day Adventists church. 
North Hall is the music building, and is directly north of the Manor House (also known as the Thomas Rutter House.)

Spiritual aspects
As a denominational school, Pine Forge Academy emphasizes its practices of Adventism in a variety of ways. While Chaplains serve in strengthening the spiritual aspect of the campus, the students are encouraged to play a part as well. Prayers are often said at the beginning of each class, before examinations, before cafeteria meals, and before church services. Church services are mandatory, and the students are given the opportunity to participate in different parts of the service, such as the praise and worship segments, prayer segments, musical selections, vesper thoughts and sermonettes located at the Pine Forge Seventh-Day Adventist Church. Chapel services are mandatory as well, where student-dean interaction is present. They take place every day except Friday and Saturday (Sabbath) in the evening and are separated by dorm.

Sports
Pine Forge Academy has a total of 5 sports teams, soccer, volleyball, track & field, basketball, and cheerleading.

Notable alumni
Barry C. Black, the 62nd Chaplain of the United States Senate, is an alumnus of Pine Forge Academy.  He was the first African-American, the first Seventh-Day Adventist and the first military chaplain to hold the office of chaplain in the United States Senate. 
 Debra Anderson - Communications Director for Former Congressman Chakka Fattah (D) Philadelphia.
 S. L. Fordham - former Senior Advisor to the Mayor and Deputy Secretary for External Affairs of Philadelphia.  Served as the Campaign Manager for former Mayor John F. Street (D) Philadelphia (2000-2008).  Served as the Executive Director for the Philadelphia Gaming Advisory Task Force.  Appeared also on Showtime's, "American Candidate" 
 Phife Dawg - Rapper and member of A Tribe Called Quest
 Therry Thomas - A singer in Committed
 Clifton Davis - An American actor, songwriter, singer, and pastor. Davis starred on the television shows That's My Mama and Amen. Davis also wrote several hits for The Jackson 5, including "Never Can Say Goodbye" and "Lookin' Through the Windows."
 Sydney Freeman Jr. - Educational theorist, author, and social scientist at the University of Idaho
 David A. Arnold  - The late stand-up comedian, sitcom writer, producer, and actor

See also

 List of Seventh-day Adventist secondary schools
 Seventh-day Adventist education

References

Boarding schools in Pennsylvania
Christian schools in Pennsylvania
Educational institutions established in 1946
Private high schools in Pennsylvania
Schools in Berks County, Pennsylvania
Adventist secondary schools in the United States
1946 establishments in Pennsylvania